Cole Proctor is a former American football coach and scout. He served as the head football coach at Morehead State University from 1990 to 1993, compiling a record of 15–29. During his tenure there, he hired Rex Ryan as his defensive coordinator. He was  the head football coach at Lees–McRae College in Banner Elk, North Carolina, then a junior college, from 1976 to 1978. After retiring from coaching, Proctor was a scout for the Arizona Cardinals (1994–1998) and the Tennessee Titans (1999–2011) of the National Football League (NFL).

Head coaching record

College

References

Year of birth missing (living people)
Living people
Arizona Cardinals scouts
East Tennessee State Buccaneers football coaches
Gardner–Webb Runnin' Bulldogs football coaches
Lees–McRae Bobcats athletic directors
Lees–McRae Bobcats football coaches
Morehead State Eagles football coaches
San Diego State Aztecs football coaches
Tennessee Titans scouts
Utah Utes football coaches
High school football coaches in New Hampshire
High school football coaches in New Jersey
Morehead State University alumni